Indio is a former and future train station in Indio, California.

Rail service began on May 29, 1876, by the Southern Pacific. The station was a stop on the transcontinental Sunset Limited; that service was commuted to Amtrak in 1971. The Eagle (later Texas Eagle) started serving the city with that line's commencement. Indio continued to see service until October 1998, closing due to low ridership. On the south side of the tracks is the Indio Bus Station, served by Greyhound Lines and Amtrak Thruway Motorcoach.

The Riverside County Transportation Commission was awarded $8.6 million in 2019 to construct a temporary platform to reestablish limited service to the city during major festivals, but these plans were canceled in 2020 amid the COVID-19 pandemic after arrangements with Union Pacific could not be resolved. The commission is also investigating the possibility of reinstating normal passenger service from Los Angeles to Indio along the Coachella Valley–San Gorgonio Pass Rail Corridor.

References

Indio, California
Buildings and structures in Riverside County, California
Railway stations closed in 1998
Former Amtrak stations in California
Former Southern Pacific Railroad stations in California
Future Amtrak stations in the United States
Railway stations in Riverside County, California
Amtrak Thruway Motorcoach stations in California
Railway stations in the United States opened in 1876